A thyrse is a type of inflorescence in which the main axis grows indeterminately, and the subaxes (branches) have determinate growth.

Gallery

References

Plant morphology